Ashraf Uddin Khan Imu is a Bangladesh Awami League politician and a former member of parliament for Dhaka-12.

Career
Imu was elected to parliament from Dhaka-12 in 1988 as a Bangladesh Awami League candidate. He is the vice-president of Dhaka District unit of Bangladesh Awami League.

References

Awami League politicians
Living people
4th Jatiya Sangsad members
Year of birth missing (living people)